Roger Noll (born March 13, 1940) is an American economist and emeritus professor of economics at Stanford University. He is also a fellow at the Stanford Institute for Economic Policy Research and the director of the Program in Regulatory Policy there. He is known for his research on sports economics, such as the construction of professional sports stadiums. He has testified against the NCAA in multiple court cases, including O'Bannon v. NCAA. In 1983, he received a Guggenheim Fellowship in economics.

References

External links
Faculty page at the Stanford Public Policy Program

1940 births
Living people
People from Monterey Park, California
Stanford University faculty
Harvard University alumni
Economists from California
California Institute of Technology alumni
21st-century American economists